Have I Offended Someone? is a compilation album featuring music by Frank Zappa, and was posthumously released in 1997. As indicated by the title, it compiles a number of Zappa's songs that have gained notoriety as being particularly offensive, and often satirical or parodic. Most of the tracks on the collection were previously available on other albums, but nearly all appear here in remixed form. The live version of "Dumb All Over" is a premiere recording. The 1984 recording of "Tinsel Town Rebellion" is listed as a premiere recording, as well, though it had previously appeared in the home video release Does Humor Belong in Music?.

The cover artwork was done by Ralph Steadman. The liner notes were written by Ed Sanders.

Track listing 
All tracks by Frank Zappa, except where noted.

References

External links 
 Track-by-track runthrough ~ all the details about the remixes.
 Lyrics and information

Compilation albums published posthumously
Frank Zappa compilation albums
1997 compilation albums
Rykodisc compilation albums
Music controversies